Arhopala moolaiana  or pale yellow oakblue, is a butterfly in the family Lycaenidae. It was described by Frederic Moore in 1879. It is found in the Indomalayan realm.

Subspecies
A. m. moolaiana Burma (Tavoy, Tenasserim, Ataran, Karen Hills)
A. m. maya  (Evans, 1932)   Mergui, Thailand
A. m. yajuna  Corbet, 1941  Sumatra, Peninsular Malaya, Borneo
A. m. klossi  Corbet, 1941 Siberut, Sipora, Pagi

References

External links
Arhopala Boisduval, 1832 at Markku Savela's Lepidoptera and Some Other Life Forms. Retrieved June 3, 2017.

Arhopala
Butterflies described in 1879